Christophe Berdos (born 17 April 1970) is a full-time international rugby union referee with the French Rugby Federation and is one of the two French representatives on the IRB's International Referees Panel.

Berdos made his debut as a referee in 1988 and refereed in the Under-19 World Championships in 2003 and 2004.

He also refereed the 2nd British Lions test match versus South Africa in 2009.

External links
 Rugby World Cup 2007 match official appointments set IRB.com

1970 births
Living people
French rugby union referees
Six Nations Championship referees
EPCR Challenge Cup referees